The Europe and Africa Zone is one of the three zones of regional Davis Cup competition in 2013.

In the Europe and Africa Zone there are four different groups in which teams compete against each other to advance to the next group.

Participating teams

Seeds:
 
 
 
 
 
 
 
 

Remaining nations:

Draw

 and  promoted to Group I in 2014.

First round

Bulgaria vs. Finland

Ireland vs. Estonia

Tunisia vs. Latvia

Monaco vs. Belarus

Moldova vs. Hungary

Bosnia and Herzegovina vs. Luxembourg

Lithuania vs. Cyprus

Portugal vs. Benin

Second round

Ireland vs. Finland

Monaco vs. Latvia

Bosnia and Herzegovina vs. Moldova

Portugal vs. Lithuania

Play-offs

Bulgaria vs. Estonia

Tunisia vs. Belarus

Hungary vs. Luxembourg

Cyprus vs. Benin

Third round

Latvia vs. Finland

Moldova vs. Portugal

References

External links
Draw Results

Euro Africa Zone II
Davis Cup Europe/Africa Zone